Shrewsbury Academy is an 11-16 mixed secondary school with academy status in Shrewsbury, Shropshire, England. It was established in September 2016 following the amalgamation of Sundorne School and The Grange School, operating across the two former school sites known as Corndon Crescent Campus and Worcester Road Campus respectively.

History

The Grange School 
The Grange School was initially a community school and converted to Academy status in 2013 when Sundorne School had also converted and sponsored the school, with both schools coming under the aegis of the Shrewsbury Academies Trust. The school offered GCSEs, BTECs, NVQs, City & Guilds courses and ASDAN awards as programmes of study for pupils.

Notable alumni 
The Grange School
 Bernard McNally, footballer

Sundorne School 
 Jack Price, footballer

References

External links 
 

Schools in Shrewsbury
Secondary schools in Shropshire
Academies in Shropshire
Educational institutions established in 2016
2016 establishments in England